Adzuna is a search engine for job advertisements. The company operates in 20 countries worldwide and the UK website aggregates job ads from several thousand sources.

Product features

Like other job search engines, Adzuna gathers and displays vacancies from large job boards, specialized job portals and employer websites into a single database.

It lists around 1 million UK job vacancies. The large database of job ads collated by the service has allowed the company to produce a number of statistics about trends in the employment market.

In November 2012, it was reported that Adzuna's job and housing market data was being supplied to the "Number 10 Dashboard", an app built by the UK's Government Digital Service to keep Prime Minister David Cameron and others up to date on key economic indicators.

In April 2013, Adzuna announced the launch of its job search engine in five additional countries—Germany, Canada, South Africa, Australia and Brazil.  In January 2014, Adzuna also launched in France, The Netherlands, Poland, Russia, and India

In September 2017, Adzuna announced the relaunch of  improved 'ValueMyCV'.

In 2018, Adzuna was reported to have won a UK government contract to provide the Department for Work and Pensions' Find a Job service.

In 2020, the UK Office for National Statistics started to publish a weekly job vacancy index using Adzuna data.

History

Adzuna was founded in 2011 by Andrew Hunter, former head of marketing of Gumtree and VP of marketing at Qype, and Doug Monro, former MD of Gumtree and COO of Zoopla. The beta site was launched in April 2011 with £300,000 seed investment from Passion Capital and Angel Investors, followed by a public press launch in July 2011. In January 2012, Adzuna announced further investment of £500,000 from Index Ventures and The Accelerator Group to expand into other verticals and countries. In April 2013, Adzuna raised a further £1M from the same investors. In July 2015, Adzuna raised an additional £2M from over 500 investors via a crowdfunding campaign on Crowdcube.

Adzuna was named by Startups.co.uk as one of the top 20 UK startups of 2011, and by V3 Magazine as one of the top ten up-and-coming UK technology startups of 2013.  In the same year it was also listed by Wired as one of the top 10 startups in London and in 2015 was named to UK government agency Tech City's 'Future Fifty' high growth startups accelerator.

In January 2014, Fairfax Media announced a joint venture with Adzuna in Australia to challenge the job board market leader there, SEEK.

In May 2018, Adzuna announced a Series C funding round of £8M from Smedvig Capital

See also
 Employment website

References

 "Entrepreneur on a mission to get Britain working". The Daily Telegraph - 13 February 2014
 Boris Johnson launches scheme to help London businesses expand overseas - Elite Business Magazine, February 2016
 T he 18 biggest UK equity crowdfunding rounds of the last year - startups.co.uk, 25 April 2016
 19 innovative UK companies using open data 2016: UK open data businesses, TechWorld, November 2016

External links
 

Online companies of the United Kingdom
Employment websites
Business services companies established in 2011
Internet properties established in 2011